The Nashville Number System is a method of transcribing music by denoting the scale degree on which a chord is built. It was developed by Neal Matthews in the late 1950s as a simplified system for the Jordanaires to use in the studio and further developed by Charlie McCoy. It resembles the Roman numeral and figured bass systems traditionally used to transcribe a chord progression since the 1700s. The Nashville Number System was compiled and published in a book by Chas. Williams in 1988.

The Nashville Number System can be used by someone with only a rudimentary background in music theory. Improvisation structures can be explained using numbers, and chord changes can be communicated mid-song by holding up the corresponding number of fingers. The system is flexible and can be embellished to include more information (such as chord color or to denote a bass note in an inverted chord). The system makes it easy for bandleaders, the record producer, or the lead vocalist to change the key of songs when recording in the studio or playing live since the new key has to be stated before the song is started. The rhythm section members can then use their knowledge of harmony to perform the song in a new key.

Scale degrees and major chords

The Nashville Number System (also referred to as NNS) is similar to (movable-do) Solfège, which uses "Do Ré Mi Fa Sol La Ti"  to represent the seven scale degrees of the Major scale. It is also similar to roman numeral analysis; however, the NNS instead uses Arabic numerals to represent each of the scale degrees. 

In the key of C, the numbers would correspond as follows: 

C=1, D=2, E=3, F=4, G=5, A=6, B=7. 

In the key of B, the numbers would be 
B=1, C=2, D=3, E=4, F=5, G=6, A=7. 

The key may be specified at the top of the written chord chart or given orally by the bandleader, record producer, or lead singer. The numbers do not change when transposing the composition into another key. They are relative to the new root note. The only required knowledge is the major scale for the given key. Unless otherwise noted, all numbers represent major chords, and each chord should be played for one measure.

So in the key of C, the Nashville Number System notation:

 1    4     1    5

represents a four-bar phrase in which the band would play a C major chord (one bar), an F major chord (one bar), a C major chord (one bar), and a G major chord (one bar).

Here is an example of how two four-bar phrases can be formed to create a section of a song.

Accidentals modifying a scale degree are usually written to the left of the number. 7 ("flat 7") represents a B major chord in the key of C, or an A major chord in the key of B or an F major chord in the key of G.

Chord type

A number by itself (without any other notation) is assumed to represent a major chord.

Minor chords are noted with a dash after the number or a lowercase m; in the key of D, 1 is D major, and 4- or 4m would be G minor. Often in the NNS, songs in minor keys will be written in the 6- of the relative major key… if the song was in G minor, the key would be listed as Bb major, and G minor chords would appear as 6-. (As stated earlier, the NNS was designed as a great shortcut, but also for those who don’t have formal music training. The concepts of i iv V7 , or borrowing a leading tone from the parallel major keys are foreign to most untrained musicians. Instead of 1- 4- 57 they would rather see 6- 2- 37. However, this can lead to some instances of very confusing changes, at which point letters should be substituted.)

If a chord root is not in the scale, the symbols  or  can be added. In the key of C major, an E triad would be notated as 3. In the key of A major, an F major triad would be notated as 6.

Other chord qualities such as major sevenths, suspended chords, and dominant sevenths use familiar symbols: 47 5sus 57 1 would stand for
F7 Gsus G7 C in the key of C, or
E7 Fsus F7 B in the key of B. A2 means "add 2" or "add 9".

Chord inversions and chords with other altered bass notes are notated analogously to regular slash chord notation. In the key of C, C/E (C major first inversion, with E bass) is written as 1/3; G/B is written as 5/7; Am/G (an inversion of Am7) is written as 6m/5; F/G (F major with G bass) is 4/5. Just as with simple chords, the numbers refer to scale degrees; specifically, the scale degree number used for the bass note is that of the note's position in the tonic's scale (as opposed to, for example, that of its position in the scale of the chord being played).  In the key of B, 1/3 stands for B/D, 5/7 stands for F/A, 6m/5 stands for Gm/F, and 4/5 stands for E/F.

Chord qualities

- = m = minor
 = dominant 7th
Δ = major 7th - (it takes four characters to write "maj7" as opposed to one, "Δ")
° = diminished
° = diminished seventh
ø = ø = half diminished seventh
° = diminished major seventh
 = augmented 5th
 = augmented minor seventh
 = Δ = augmented major seventh

Rhythm and articulation
NNS charts also use unique rhythmic symbols, and variations in practice exist.  A diamond shape around a number indicates that the chord should be held out or allowed to ring as a whole note. Conversely, the marcato symbol ^ over the number, or a staccato dot underneath, indicates that the chord should be immediately choked or stopped. The "push" symbol ("<" and ">" are both used) syncopates the indicated chord, moving its attack back one-eighth note to the preceding "and". A sequence of several chords in a single measure is notated by underlining the desired chord numbers. (Some charts use parentheses or a box for this.) If two numbers are underlined, it is assumed that the chord values are even. In 4/4 time, that would mean the first chord would be played for two beats, and the second chord would be played for two beats. 2- 5 1 means a minor 2 chord for two beats, then a 5 chord for two beats, then a 1 chord for four beats. If the measure is not evenly divided, beats can be indicated by dots or hash marks over the chord numbers. Three dots over a given chord would tell the musician to play that chord for three beats. Alternatively, rhythmic notation can be used.

Example
"After You've Gone" by Creamer and Layton 1918

Verse, mm.7-23 ( and, for comparison, the score ):

Chorus, mm.24-43 ( and, for comparison, the score ):

See also

Nashville E9 tuning and Nashville tuning (high strung)

References

External links
Diamond on the 1 – a "gig bag book" by Nashville musician Jonathan Riggs that introduces the basic concepts of the Nashville Number System
Interactive NNS chart
Learn the Nashville Number System – information on rhythm notation is included in the Flash-based "Nashville Number System Quiz and Rhythm Tutorial". It also includes a separate Flash-based ear training quiz.
Oral use example: "Ok.. it's a standard 12 bar in "G" but add a 2 on the bridge ...kick it off from the 5 ... hit the 4 on the way down, and then into the 1 ... watch me for the 2"
The Nashville Number Fake Book by Trevor de Clercq – This book includes a detailed overview of the Nashville Number System as well as complete charts for 200 acclaimed country songs.
The Nashville Number System – Site for the book Song Charting Made Easy: a Play-along Guide to the Nashville Number System by Jim Riley, with a preview including charts and play-along music tracks
The Number Song – a chart with (auto-playing) audio explanation and playthrough by Jimi Whitelaw, Chip Hardy, Rod Lewis, and Tim Grogan of Nashville Demo Studio. Shows standard musical notation such as repeat signs, D.S. al coda, rhythmic notation, and staccato dots used in a Nashville Number System chart.

Musical notation
Accompaniment
Rhythm section
Country music